Fore  is a barony in northern County Westmeath, Ireland. It was formed by 1672.

Geography
Fore has an area of 49,056 acres, making it the largest barony in Westmeath but placing it among the smaller baronies in Ireland. Mullaghmeen, the highest point in Westmeath is located in Fore and at 261 metres (856 ft) is the lowest county high point in Ireland. The barony contains three large lakes, Lough Derravaragh, Lough Sheelin and Lough Lene and the River Inny flows through the barony before it connects to the River Shannon. The barony borders the counties of Cavan, Longford and Meath.

Civil parishes of the barony
This table lists an historical geographical sub-division of the barony known as the civil parish (not to be confused with an Ecclesiastical parish).

Towns and villages
Castlepollard, Collinstown, Coole, Crookedwood
Finnea, Fore

Places of interest
Fore Abbey, Benedictine Abbey from 630 A.D
Lough Lene, a scenic   lough
Lough Derravaragh, a  lough, shaped somewhat like Italy, popular angling destination 
Lough Sheelin, a  lough, largest lake in Westmeath
Mullaghmeen, Highest point in Westmeath
Ranaghan, ringfort location
Tullynally Castle, historic castle
Castlepollard, largest urban area in Fore

References

External links

Fore